Leave It All Behind may refer to:

 Leave It All Behind (album), a 2008 album by The Foreign Exchange
 "Leave It All Behind" (The Features song), a 2004 song by The Features
 "Leave It All Behind" (Five Finger Death Punch song), a 2020 song by Five Finger Death Punch